Ottapalam was a Lok Sabha constituency in Kerala. The seat was reserved for scheduled castes. It was replaced by Alathur Lok Sabha Constituency in 2009.

Assembly segments
Ottapalam Lok Sabha constituency is composed of the following assembly segments:
Thrithala (SC)
Pattambi
Ottapalam
Coyalmannam (SC)
Chelakara (SC)
Wadakkancherry
Kunnamkulam

Members of Parliament
1977: K. Kunhambu, Indian National Congress
1980: A.K. Balan, Communist Party of India (Marxist)
1984: K.R. Narayanan, Indian National Congress
1989: K.R. Narayanan, Indian National Congress
1991: K.R. Narayanan, Indian National Congress
1993 (By-election): S.Sivaraman, Communist Party of India (Marxist)
1996: S. Ajaya Kumar, Communist Party of India (Marxist)
1998: S. Ajaya Kumar, Communist Party of India (Marxist)
1999: S. Ajaya Kumar, Communist Party of India (Marxist)
2004: S. Ajaya Kumar, Communist Party of India (Marxist)

See also
 Ottapalam
 List of Constituencies of the Lok Sabha

References

External links
 Election Commission of India: https://web.archive.org/web/20081218010942/http://www.eci.gov.in/StatisticalReports/ElectionStatistics.asp

Former Lok Sabha constituencies of Kerala
Former constituencies of the Lok Sabha
2008 disestablishments in India
Constituencies disestablished in 2008